O Mallige is a 1997 Indian Kannada-language romance drama film directed by V. Manohar and written by K. Ananthu. Besides direction for the first time, Manohar has composed the music and also enacted in a supporting role.

The film mainly stars Ramesh Aravind, Charulatha, Chaitali (Bina Rajagopal) and model-turned-actor Zulfi Syed. Syed was credited as Amar Mayur in the film.

The film, upon release met with very good positive response at the box-office and critics as well. It was one of the highest-grossing films of the year 1997. Singer S. P. Balasubrahmanyam was awarded the Karnataka State Film Award for Best Male Playback Singer for his rendition of a song, actor Ramesh fetched the Best Actor award and Chaitali won the best supporting actress award at the Udaya Film Awards.
Sadhu Kokila's character Musthafa was later on used in 2013 movie Googly.

Plot
Mallige (Charulata) lives in a small village with her uncle (V.Manohar). A heart patient, Manohar has an ambitious wannabe model in his son Nacchi (Zulfi Syed) who is lost in the bliss of the big city. When he suffers another nearly fatal stroke, Nacchi reluctantly returns to be by his dying father's side. Seizing the opportunity, the dying man manages to knot the innocent village belle Mallige to our dear city chap. As much as Nacchi hates the decision, he goes along considering his father's health. He even manages to consummate the wedlock under the influence of alcohol. A few days later the old man dies leaving the helpless girl to his son. The very next day Nacchi leaves her who has nowhere to turn for support.

Days roll by and soon Mallige realizes she is expecting a baby. To take things under her own control she decides to join her absconding husband in the city. Nachi changing his name as Naresh Patel has shifted base to city and is shown wooing the rich daughter (Chaitali) of a millionaire (Avinash) to fuel his aspirations of becoming a successful model. Soon the young couple is shown exchanging sweet nothings in parks and restaurants while the pregnant girl is roaming the streets of the city looking for her ignorant husband.

Krishna Murthy alias Kitti (Ramesh) who is also an aspiring model in between odd jobs. An accident brings Kitti and Mallige together as she is seriously injured in the mishap and loses all memory of her immediate past. For his convenience to shoo off the prying landlords, Kitti brings Mallige to his house and christens her Lakshmi since she has no memory of her name. A special bond of affection starts forming between the two. Nacchi continues his Casanova ways with the rich girl unaware of any of these happenings.

Lakshmi bears a child and names him Ganesha. Meanwhile, Kitti manages to get a plum offer from the same firm that works with Mallige's husband. Soon Nacchi has his girlfriend realise that he is married and so starts encouraging Kitti instead to get back at him. Nacchi confronts her and ends up apologizing for his “mistake” but she is firm in her decision and decides not to have anything to do with him.

Things start falling into place when she sees Mallige at Kitti's place and informs him about the truth. Kitti is heartbroken at the thought of losing Mallige to a stranger. She has been his life for the past few years and this sudden change of events scares him. Nacchi meets his long lost wife in Kitti's house and confronts him to return her to him. In the end, Mallige's memory has revived pretending to be losing memory again (fact known only to the doctor) do not recognize Nacchi and ends up uniting with Kitty.

Cast 
 Ramesh Arvind as Kitty (Krishnamurthy)
 Charulatha as Mallige (Lakshmi)
 Zulfi Syed as Nacchi
 Chaithali as Karishma 
 Ashok
 Avinash
 V. Manohar
 Sadhu Kokila as Musthafa
 Vaijanath Biradar as Tippayya
 M. N. Lakshmidevi
 Ramesh rao as Yenka 
 Rathnakar 
 Master Santhosh
 Srinivas Prabhu

Soundtrack 
All the songs are composed and written by V. Manohar. The opening tune of the song Sura Sundara  was re-used in the Hindi song Dance Basanti  from the 2014 movie Ungli.

Awards
 Karnataka State Film Awards
 Karnataka State Film Award for Best Male Playback Singer - S. P. Balasubrahmanyam

 Udaya Film Awards
 Best Actor - Ramesh Aravind
 Best Supporting Actress - Chaitali
 Best Male Playback Singer - Rajesh Krishnan

References

External links 

 O Mallige at Bharathmovies

1997 films
1990s Kannada-language films
Indian romantic drama films
Films scored by V. Manohar
1997 directorial debut films
1997 romantic drama films